The  is a flower festival held annually in Hiroshima, Japan.

Overview
The Hiroshima Flower Festival has been held every year since 1977 during Golden Week, from 3 May to 5 May.
More than one million people take part in the festival each year.

The festival includes multiple stages for entertainment, shops, a small zoo, and other amusement attractions along Peace Boulevard and in Hiroshima Peace Memorial Park. Many concerts, dancing shows, fashion shows, talk shows, and traditional and contemporary performances featuring local citizens and other events are held throughout the area. Locals also participate in a parade, and Yosakoi dance on Peace Boulevard.

History
The origin of the festival is the Japanese professional baseball Central League Champion parade for the Hiroshima Toyo Carp team in 1975.

Themes
The underlying themes of the festival are to:
 Make Hiroshima full of flowers, greens, and music.
 Share the brightness and dignity of life with all people.
 Appeal for a warm-hearted cultural and personnel interchange from Hiroshima to the world.

Events
The key events of the festival are:

Parades
 Flower parade on May 3.
 Kinsai (visit us) Yosakoi parade on May 5.

Concerts and performances
 Multiple concerts and performances on twenty stages, and in seventy squares every day.
 Candlelight services with peace messages and origami cranes
 Mikoshi, Kagura and peace concerts are held at night.

Flower singer
 A featured performer termed the Flower singer was arranged to sing the theme song each year up to 2005. From 2006 the Flower singer was replaced with Flower Festival special guests, and other guests were also noted. These performers have been:

References

External links
Official website 

Festivals in Hiroshima
Flower festivals in Japan
Spring (season) events in Japan